Yukarıovacık (literally "upper little plains" in Turkish) may refer to the following places in Turkey:

 Yukarıovacık, Gerede, a village in the district of Gerede, Bolu Province
 Yukarıovacık, Hamamözü, a village in the district of Hamamözü, Amasya Province
 Yukarıovacık, Karakoçan